Sir Thomas Hunter (2 October 1872 – 19 March 1953) was a Scottish Unionist Party politician who served as the Member of Parliament (MP) for Perth. He was one of the leading campaigners against Jews from Germany being allowed to enter the United Kingdom.

Hunter was elected for the Perth seat at the 1935 general election, and held it until he stood down from the House of Commons at the 1945 general election.

References

External links 
 

1872 births
1953 deaths
Members of the Parliament of the United Kingdom for Scottish constituencies
UK MPs 1935–1945
Unionist Party (Scotland) MPs